Four Women may refer to:

 Four Women (comics), an American comic series by Sam Keith
 "Four Women" (song), a 1966 jazz song by musician Nina Simone
Naalu Pennungal, or Four Women, a 2007 Indian film by Adoor Gopalakrishnan
 Four Women (1975 film), a film by Julie Dash
 Four Women (1947 film), a Spanish drama film